The Carreteras Nacionales de España or National Roads of Spain are roads of governmental property, managed by the Ministry of Development (Spain) and form the Red de Carreteras del Estado or State Roads Network.
A road numbering scheme is used according to rules by the fourth General Road Plan (Plan General de Carreteras) of 1939-1941 (Plan Peña).
Six radial roads which connect Madrid with its coasts and its borders divide the Spanish continental territory (except for the Canary Islands and Balearic Islands) into 6 radial sectors. These radial roads are enumerated in clockwise fashion as follows:
 N-I from Madrid to France via Irún or Carretera de Burgos: Northbound
 N-II from Madrid to France via La Jonquera or Carretera de Barcelona: North-eastbound
 N-III from Madrid to Valencia or Carretera de Valencia: Eastbound
 N-IV from Madrid to Cádiz or Carretera de Andalucía: Southbound
 N-V from Madrid to the Portuguese border or Carretera de Extremadura: Westbound
 N-VI from Madrid to A Coruña or Carretera de A Coruña: North-westbound.

The national roads were upgraded to Autovías, and changed their name to their geographical destination instead of the city they link to Madrid, and not varying their number (A-1, A-2,...).

The code for the national roads consists of 3 digits (e.g.: N-XXX, where X is a number) assigned as follows:
 The first digit represents the number of the sector of origin: those roads starting between N-I and N-II are designated as N-1XX; those between N-II and N-III, N-2XX etc.
 The second number represents the straight line distance in hundreds of kilometers starting at the Puerta del Sol, Madrid. Thus, if the road starts less than 100 km away the road is assigned the number 0; 1 if originating between 100 and 200 km away from Madrid, and so on.
 The third digit reflects its direction: An odd number is assigned if the road is radial that is emanating from Madrid; if it is a transversal road not leading to Madrid, it is assigned an even number, including 0. For a radial road the origin is set as the closest end to Madrid; for a transversal road, the origin is set at the end which leads into a counterclockwise direction.

For example:
 The road which links Cordoba and Tarragona via Cuenca is not a radial road. It starts in Córdoba so the direction is anti-clockwise (from the South to the North-East). Córdoba is between N-IV and N-V, and Córdoba is 295 km away from Madrid, so the first two numbers are N-42X. The third number is an even number, which in this case is 0. So the road from Córdoba to Tarragona via Cuenca is N-420.
 The road which links Madrid and Ciudad Real via Toledo diverts from N-IV (N-4XX) in Madrid (N-X0X), and it is a radial road (odd number). Consequently, its code is N-401.

Some exceptions apply for roads within Basque Country or Navarra, where another numbering scheme applies (e.g.: N-102).

Table

See also
Highways in Spain

 
Lists of roads in Spain